
Gmina Łąck is a rural gmina (administrative district) in Płock County, Masovian Voivodeship, in east-central Poland.

The gmina contains part of the protected area called Gostynin-Włocławek Landscape Park.

Villages
Gmina Łąck contains the villages and settlements of Antoninów, Grabina, Korzeń Królewski, Korzeń Rządowy, Kościuszków, Koszelówka, Łąck, Ludwików, Matyldów, Nowe Rumunki, Podlasie, Sędeń Duży, Sędeń Mały, Wincentów, Władysławów, Wola Łącka, Zaździerz, Zdwórz and Zofiówka.

Neighbouring gminas
Gmina Łąck is bordered by the city of Płock and by the gminas of Gąbin, Gostynin, Nowy Duninów and Szczawin Kościelny.

References
Polish official population figures 2006

Lack
Płock County